In Unix, Plan 9, and Unix-like operating systems, the strip program removes information from executable binary programs and object files that is not essential or required for normal and correct execution, thus potentially resulting in better performance and sometimes significantly less disk space usage. The resulting file is a stripped binary.

Details
The information removed may consist of debugging and symbol information; however, the standard leaves the scope of the changes to the binary up to the implementer of the stripping program.

Furthermore, the use of strip can improve the security of the binary against reverse engineering as it would be comparatively more difficult to analyze a binary without the extra information that would otherwise be removed.

The effect of strip can be achieved directly by the linker. For instance, in GNU Compiler Collection this option is "-s".

The GNU Project ships an implementation of strip as part of the GNU Binutils package. strip has been ported to other operating systems including Microsoft Windows.

See also 

 Dead code elimination
 Executable compression
 List of Unix commands
 Strings (Unix)
 Debug symbol
 Symbol table

References

External links 

 
 

Unix programming tools
Unix SUS2008 utilities
Plan 9 commands